The following are links to lists of United States cities with large ethnic minority populations. (There are many cities in the US with no ethnic majority.)

Asian Americans
 List of U.S. communities with Asian American majority populations
 List of U.S. cities with large Cambodian-American populations
 List of U.S. cities with significant Chinese American populations 
 List of U.S. cities with large Filipino American populations
 List of U.S. cities with large Japanese American populations
 List of U.S. cities with significant Korean American populations
 List of U.S. cities with large Indian American populations
 List of U.S. cities with large South Asian American populations (combined populations from Pakistan, Bangladesh, India, Sri Lanka, Nepal, etc)
 List of U.S. cities with large Thai American populations
 List of U.S. cities with large Vietnamese American populations

Black Americans
 List of U.S. cities with large African American populations
 List of U.S. cities with African American majority populations
List of U.S. cities with large Nigerian American populations

West Indian Americans
 List of West Indian communities in the United States
List of U.S. cities with large Jamaican American populations
List of U.S. cities with large Trinidadian and Tobagonian American populations
List of U.S. cities with large Guyanese American populations
List of U.S. cities with large Haitian American populations

European Americans
 List of U.S. cities with large European American populations
 List of U.S. cities with large Armenian American populations
 List of U.S. cities with large Austrian American populations
 List of U.S. cities with large Czech American populations
 List of U.S. cities with large Danish American populations
 List of U.S. cities with large Dutch American populations
 List of U.S. cities with large English American populations
 List of U.S. cities with large French American populations
 List of U.S. cities with large German American populations
 List of U.S. cities with large Greek American populations
 List of U.S. cities with large Hungarian American populations
 List of U.S. cities with large Irish American populations
 List of U.S. cities with large Italian American populations
List of U.S. cities with large Norwegian American populations
 List of U.S. cities with large Polish American populations
 List of U.S. cities with large Portuguese American populations
 List of U.S. cities with large Romanian American populations
 List of U.S. cities with large Russian American populations
List of U.S. cities with large Turkish American populations
 List of U.S. cities with large Spanish American populations
List of U.S. cities with large Swiss American populations

Latino Americans
 List of U.S. cities with large Latino American populations
List of U.S. cities with large Brazilian American populations
List of U.S. cities with large Cuban American populations
List of U.S. cities with large Dominican American populations
List of U.S. cities with large Puerto Rican American populations
List of U.S. cities with large Mexican American populations
List of U.S. cities with large Guatemalan American populations
List of U.S. cities with large Salvadorian American populations
List of U.S. cities with large Honduran American populations

Middle Eastern Americans
 List of U.S. cities with large Arab American populations
 List of U.S. cities with large Iranian American populations
 List of U.S. cities with large American Jewish populations

Native Americans
 List of U.S. communities with Native American majority populations